Ogilvie is a community in the Canadian province of Nova Scotia, located in  Kings County. It is located between the communities of Burlington and Harbourville.

Name 
Along with the Scots and Turners, the Ogilvies were one of the first families to settle the area. The area is named after them.

References

Communities in Kings County, Nova Scotia